Martín Damián Díaz Peña (born March 17, 1988 in Montevideo), is a Uruguayan footballer who plays as a centre back.

International career
Díaz was capped by Uruguayan under-17 squad for the 2005 FIFA U-17 World Championship, tournament where he was the captain of the team.

References

External links

 

Martín Díaz at playmakerstats.com (English version of ceroacero.es)

1988 births
Living people
Uruguayan footballers
Uruguayan expatriate footballers
Footballers from Montevideo
Association football defenders
C.A. Rentistas players
Defensor Sporting players
FC Dinamo București players
CD Badajoz players
Montevideo Wanderers F.C. players
Atlético de Rafaela footballers
Liverpool F.C. (Montevideo) players
NorthEast United FC players
FC Pune City players
Racing Club de Montevideo players
Uruguayan Primera División players
Segunda División B players
Argentine Primera División players
Liga II players
I-League players
Expatriate footballers in Argentina
Expatriate footballers in Romania
Expatriate footballers in Spain
Expatriate footballers in India
Uruguayan expatriate sportspeople in Argentina
Uruguayan expatriate sportspeople in Romania
Uruguayan expatriate sportspeople in Spain
Uruguayan expatriate sportspeople in India